Wahid Mohammed Mohammed Al-Khyat (born 1 January 1986) is a Yemeni international footballer who plays for Al-Ahli Club Sana'a as a midfielder.

Career
Al-Khyat has played club football for Al-Ahli Club Sana'a and Al-Watani. He won the Yemeni League in 2007, and was a runner-up in 2013–14. He also won the Yemeni President Cup in 2008–09, and the Yemeni Super Cup in 2014–15.

He made his international debut for Yemen in 2011, and was a squad member at the 2019 AFC Asian Cup.

On 26 January 2015, Al-Riyadh has signed Alhassan for one seasons from Al-Ahli Club Sana'a.

References

1986 births
Living people
Yemeni footballers
Yemen international footballers
Yemeni expatriate footballers
Al-Ahli Club Sana'a players
Al-Riyadh SC players
Al-Watani Club players
Yemeni League players
Saudi First Division League players
Association football midfielders
Yemeni expatriate sportspeople in Oman
Expatriate footballers in Oman
Yemeni expatriate sportspeople in Saudi Arabia
Expatriate footballers in Saudi Arabia
2019 AFC Asian Cup players